Goran Savanović (born 28 August 1973) is a Serbian former professional basketball player.

Professional career 
A small forward, Savanović played for Novi Sad, Beobanka, Prokom Trefl Sopot, Crvena zvezda, Maccabi Ness, Anwil Włocławek, NIS Vojvodina, Partizan, Oostende, ĆEZ Nymburk, and Prostějov. He retired as a player with Prostějov in 2009.

Career achievements
 Czech National League champion: 2  (with ČEZ Nymburk: 2005–06, 2006–07)
 Czech Republic Cup winner: 1  (with ČEZ Nymburk: 2006–07)
 Polish Cup winner: 1  (with Prokom Trefl Sopot: 1999–2000)

References

External links
 Goran Savanovic at eurobasket.com
 Goran Savanovic at realgm.com
 Goran Savanovic at proballers.com
 Goran Savanovic at euroleague.net
 Goran Savanovic at fibaeurope.com

1973 births
Living people
ABA League players
Asseco Gdynia players
Basketball Nymburk players
BC Oostende players
Bosnia and Herzegovina expatriate basketball people in Israel
Bosnia and Herzegovina expatriate basketball people in Serbia
Bosnia and Herzegovina men's basketball players
KK Beobanka players
KK Crvena zvezda players
KK Novi Sad players
KK Partizan players
KK Vojvodina Srbijagas players
KK Włocławek players
Maccabi Ra'anana players
Point guards
Serbian expatriate basketball people in Belgium
Serbian expatriate basketball people in Israel
Serbian expatriate basketball people in the Czech Republic
Serbian expatriate basketball people in Poland
Serbian men's basketball players
Serbs of Bosnia and Herzegovina
Shooting guards
Sportspeople from Banja Luka